Linton Village College is a secondary school in Linton, South Cambridgeshire, England. Established in 1937 as a village college, the school now has academy status.

The school has specialisms in Business and Enterprise and Applied Learning.

References

External links 
 Linton Village College Official Website
 Cambridgeshire County Council
 Inspection Report, May, 2012
 School Prospectus, September, 2011

Educational institutions established in 1937
Academies in Cambridgeshire
Secondary schools in Cambridgeshire
1937 establishments in England
Village College